The 2020 Internazionali di Tennis Città di Trieste was a professional tennis tournament played on clay courts. It was the 1st edition of the tournament which was part of the 2020 ATP Challenger Tour. It took place in Trieste, Italy between 24 and 30 August 2020.

Singles main-draw entrants

Seeds

 1 Rankings are as of 16 March 2020.

Other entrants
The following players received wildcards into the singles main draw:
  Matteo Gigante
  Lorenzo Musetti
  Giulio Zeppieri

The following player received entry into the singles main draw using a protected ranking:
  Maximilian Marterer

The following players received entry from the qualifying draw:
  Carlos Alcaraz
  Geoffrey Blancaneaux
  Riccardo Bonadio
  Tomás Martín Etcheverry

The following players received entry as lucky losers:
  Viktor Galović
  Tobias Kamke

Champions

Singles

 Carlos Alcaraz def.  Riccardo Bonadio 6–4, 6–3.

Doubles

 Ariel Behar /  Andrey Golubev def.  Hugo Gaston /  Tristan Lamasine 6–4, 6–2.

References

Internazionali di Tennis Città di Trieste
2020 in Italian tennis
August 2020 sports events in Italy